The Women's omnium event of the 2015 UCI Track Cycling World Championships was held on 21–22 February 2015.

Results

Scratch race
The scratch race was started 13:45.

Individual pursuit
The individual pursuit was started 15:35.

Elimination race
The elimination race was started 21:55.

500 m time trial
The 500 m time trial was started at 11:00.

Flying lap
The flying lap was started at 12:40.

Points race
The points race was held at 14:10.

Final standings
After all events.

References

Women's omnium
UCI Track Cycling World Championships – Women's omnium